Freshwater: A comedy is a play written and produced by Virginia Woolf in 1935, and the only play she wrote. Although only performed once in her lifetime, it has been translated into many languages and produced in many countries since. Alfred Lord Tennyson appears as a character in this play.

History 

Virginia Woolf researched the life of her great-aunt, the photographer Julia Margaret Cameron, publishing her findings in an essay titled Pattledom (1925), and later in her introduction to her 1926 edition of Cameron's photographs. She had begun work on a play based on an episode in Cameron's life in 1923, but abandoned it. Finally it was performed on 18 January 1935 at the studio of her sister, Vanessa Bell on Fitzroy Street in 1935. Woolf directed it herself, and the cast were mainly members of the Bloomsbury Group, including Vanessa, her daughter Angelica Garnett, Virginia's husband Leonard and Duncan Grant, Angelica's father. Freshwater is a short three act comedy satirizing the Victorian era. It was not performed again in Woolf's lifetime. It was found among Leonard Woolf's papers after his death in 1969 and was not published till 1976, when the Hogarth Press produced an edition, edited by Lucio Ruotolo, who was living in Virginia Woolf's home, Monk's House, at the time. The edition was illustrated by Edward Gorey.

Dramatis personae 

 Julia Margaret Cameron
 Charles Henry Hay Cameron, her husband
 G. F. Watts, painter
 Ellen Terry, actress, his wife
 Lord Tennyson, poet, a neighbour
 Mr Craig
 Mary Magdalene, housemaid

Plot 

The play is named after Freshwater, Isle of Wight, where Julia Margaret Cameron lived in a somewhat bohemian atmosphere at her home, Dimbola Lodge, surrounded by a number of artists and literary figures, including George Frederick Watts and Tennyson in the 1860s. Tennyson's nearby home, Farringford was another artistic centre. The plot revolves around the attempts by the young actress Ellen Terry to escape from her marriage to the much older Watts, partly family history, partly mocking the conventions of the Victorian times that the Bloomsbury group had fought to escape. The Camerons are set to embark for India, while both Mrs Cameron and Watts are intent on portraying Ellen in their respective media. Ellen on the other hand views a young naval lieutenant as her escape, with an offer to escape to Bloomsbury. This collapses a number of historic events into a single afternoon.

Performance 

In New York in 2009, both the 1923 and 1935 versions were combined for the first time in an Off-Broadway production to celebrate Woolf's 128th birthday, Charles Isherwood praising the wordplay. In London the play was performed in Virginia Woolf's former home, 46 Gordon Square (now part of the School of Arts, Birkbeck College) in 2012. Freshwater has also been performed at Monk's House in Rodmell, Sussex.

The play has been translated into French (1982), Spanish (1980) and German (2017). It was performed in Paris at the Centre Pompidou in 1982, and in Mainz, Germany in 1994. The French production was revived in New York in 1983, starring Eugène Ionesco, Alain Robbe-Grillet, Nathalie Sarraute, Joyce Mansour, Guy Dumur and Florence Delay.

Reception 

Although a slight work not intended for publication, and easily dismissed as frivolous, it has been given a larger meaning when placed in the broader context of Woolf's work and views. For beneath the comedic elements, there is an exploration of both generational change and artistic freedom. Both Cameron and Woolf fought against the class and gender dynamics of Victorianism and the play shows links to both To the Lighthouse and A Room of One's Own that would follow. Ellen's flight to Bloomsbury symbolising freedom from patriarchy.

References

Bibliography 

 
  (Digital edition)
 
 
 
 
 
 
 
 
 
 

 Websites

 
 
  (includes invitation to first performance in 1935 and Lucio Ruotolo's introduction to the 1976 Hogarth Press edition)
 

 Editions

Bibliography references 

Virginia Woolf
Virginia Woolf in performing arts